Wacker Neuson SE (formerly: Wacker Construction Equipment AG) with headquarters in Munich, Germany, is a manufacturer of construction equipment and compact machines for concrete and construction site technology listed on the stock market. The group includes the product brands Wacker Neuson, Kramer and Weidemann. The family business, founded in 1848, employs around 6,000 people worldwide (2021).

History

The company was founded in 1848 by Johann Christian Wacker as a blacksmith’s shop in Dresden (Germany), trading as Wacker. It started industrial production in 1875. In 1930, the company’s engineers developed a high-frequency technology for internal vibrators. At the same time, the first electrically powered rammer – an innovation in concrete and soil compaction – was developed and produced. Before the start of World War II, the company had already expanded its product portfolio and created a domestic and international sales and retail organisation. Progress was halted by the destruction of the production facility in Dresden just before the end of the war.

Business operations were resumed in Kulmbach in 1945, and the company moved its headquarters to Munich in 1951. The first foreign affiliate was established in 1957, in Hartford (Wisconsin, United States). In 1986, Hartford operations relocated to Menomonee Falls, now home to a production facility and logistics centre. Subsequently, the company stepped up its international presence.

The group changed structure from a limited company (GmbH) to a public limited company, Wacker Construction Equipment AG, in 2002. Until 2005, Wacker only developed, produced, and distributed light construction equipment up to approximately three tonnes in the concrete technology, soil & asphalt compaction, demolition and utility segments. Following the acquisition of Weidemann GmbH in 2005, the company branched out into compact construction equipment and the agricultural sector. Drillfix AG (Switzerland) and Ground Heaters, Inc. (United States) were purchased in 2006.

The company was floated on 15 May 2007, and is listed in the Prime Standard of the Frankfurt Stock Exchange. It was admitted to the SDAX in autumn 2007.

On October 31, 2007, the company merged with Neuson Kramer Baumaschinen AG (Linz, Austria), a manufacturer of compact construction equipment including compact excavators, wheel loaders, dumpers and skid steer loaders. Neuson Kramer Baumaschinen AG itself was the product of a merger between Neuson Baumaschinen GmbH and the long-established company Kramer-Werke GmbH. Neuson was established in 1981 as Neuson Hydraulik GmbH. Based in Linz, the company initially developed hydraulic mini-excavators. Neuson Baumaschinen GmbH was established in 1990. Dumper manufacturer Lifton Ltd. (GB) was acquired in 1998, and skid-steer loaders were added to the product range in 2004. Neuson and Kramer merged in 2001.

In February 2009, Wacker Construction Equipment AG underwent a change of legal form and assumed its current name of Wacker Neuson SE.

Between 2011 and 2017, Wacker Neuson produced, in its plant in Hörsching, mini-excavators for Caterpillar. This resulted in the Austrian subsidiary being awarded distinction in Austria’s Leading Companies in 2015. In 2017, the strategic alliance for the sale of telehandlers and wheel loaders started between Kramer and John Deere. Via John Deere’s independent dealer network, Kramer machines for agriculture are marketed under Kramer’s brand name and design.

In 2022, the Wacker Neuson Group acquired the Spanish company Enarco S.A. Enar is a manufacturer of light construction equipment, specialised in concrete compaction. Alongside a wide range of internal vibrators for concrete, the company’s product portfolio also covers vibratory plates, rammers and walk-behind rollers for soil and asphalt compaction.  Enar produces its equipment in Zaragoza, Spain.

Group overview

Wacker Neuson SE organises its activities by region (Europe, America, and Asia-Pacific). The group is divided into three business fields: Light Equipment, Compact Equipment (weighing up to approximately 14 tons), and Services (spare parts, maintenance and repair). The Compact Equipment segment supplies excavators, wheel loaders, telescopic handlers, skid-steer loaders and dumpers. These machines are used in application areas including structural and civil engineering, road construction, agriculture, gardening, landscaping, municipal works, recycling and industrial projects. The group comprises the three brands Wacker Neuson, Weidemann and Kramer as well as affiliates and production plants.

Brands
Under the Wacker Neuson brand, the group sells walk-behind and hand-held construction equipment worldwide. Products here include rammers, vibratory plates, hammers, cutting tools, internal & external vibrators and construction site equipment, as well as compact construction equipment such as compact excavators, wheel loaders, dumpers and Skid-steer loaders. All-wheel-drive wheel loaders, telescopic handlers and telescopic wheel loaders are sold under the Kramer brand. The Weidemann brand mainly produces machines such as articulated wheel loaders, telescopic wheel loaders and telehandlers for the agricultural sector.

Management 
Since June 2021, Dr. Karl Tragl has been leading the company. The head of the Supervisory Board is Neuson founder Hans Neunteufel.

Shareholder structure
Status as of December 31, 2019.
58.0% share pool (families Wacker and Neunteufel)
42.0% free float

Innovations 
Hermann Wacker invented the first vibratory rammer in 1930, and the Hoftrac by Weidemann was created in 1972. The Group is working on further innovations and technologies, for example in the area of alternative drives, driver assistance systems, and the intelligent digital networking of products and services.

Zero emission 
The Wacker Neuson Group has been working for several years on emission-free construction machines and equipment. In 2015, the company introduced the first battery-powered vibratory rammer. Meanwhile, entire construction sites can be operated emission-free with the zero emission solutions. The performance is equal to the conventional machines of the same class and the running time is sufficient for an average workday.

Autonomous vibratory plate 
At the 2019 Bauma fair, the autonomously controlled vibratory plate DPU110r equipped with compaction control was first introduced as a study. The vibratory plate is controlled by a tablet. The area to be compacted is drawn in on the touchscreen using your finger. Compaction work is seamlessly documented, as the vibratory plate digitally records all steps taken and thus automatically provides a daily report sheet for contractors.

Smart Factory 
The Wacker Neuson Group develops “Smart Factory” solutions that contribute to optimising production. This includes, for example, the application of assistance systems in assembly, production and intralogistics, as well as digital malfunction and quality management. Additionally, digital objects and models are being worked on that, as a first step to a “digital twin”, will illustrate reality and should bring about improvements in machine monitoring and time management. The company is now using 3D-printing technology in prototype construction.

Smart processes 
In the area of digitalisation, the Wacker Neuson Group is testing the application of Augmented, Virtual and Mixed Reality in the area of “Smart Processes” for an even faster and more efficient working principle. Here, these technologies come into application, for example, in positioning attachments, comparing old and new versions, and testing the 360° visibility of the operator and the movement of objects.

Locations

Group headquarters 
 Wacker Neuson SE Munich, Germany.

Training center Europe 
Wacker Neuson Academy Reichertshofen, Germany.

Production Europe 
Wacker Neuson SE Reichertshofen, Germany.
Wacker Neuson Linz GmbH Hörsching, Austria.
Weidemann GmbH, Diemelsee-Flechtdorf, Germany.
Kramer-Werke GmbH, Pfullendorf, Germany.
Wacker Neuson Kragujevac d.o.o. Kragujevac, Serbia.

Production America
Wacker Neuson Corporation Menomonee Falls (WI), USA.

Production Asia 
Wacker Neuson Machinery (China) Co., Ltd. Pinghu City, Zhejiang Province, China.

References

External links

 Wacker Neuson company Website

Construction equipment manufacturers of Germany
Manufacturing companies based in Dresden
Manufacturing companies based in Munich
German brands
Manufacturing companies established in 1848
German companies established in 1848
Multinational companies headquartered in Germany
Pump manufacturers